Redlich is a surname of Jewish-Austrian origin. Notable people with the surname include:

 Ed Redlich, American television producer
 Emil Redlich (1866–1930), Austrian neurologist
 Forrest Redlich, Australian independent screenwriter/producer
 Frederick Redlich (1910–2004), Jewish Austrian born American psychiatrist
 Hans Redlich (1903–1968), Austrian classical composer
 Norman Redlich (1925–2011), American lawyer
 Oswald Redlich (1858–1944), Austrian historian
 Otto Redlich (1896–1978), Austrian born American physical chemist
 Patricia Redlich (1940–2011), Irish clinical psychologist
 Robert Redlich (born 1946), commissioner of the Victorian Independent Broad-based Anti-corruption Commission
 Shimon Redlich (born 1935), Israeli historian
 Vivian Redlich, a missionary killed in Papua New Guinea during World War II
 Warren Redlich (born 1966), American lawyer and politician

See also
 Krystyna Kurczab-Redlich, Polish journalist
 Redlich–Obersteiner's zone, boundary in the central nervous system discovered by Emil Redlich
 Redlich–Kwong equation of state, equation in thermodynamics developed by Otto Redlich

Jewish surnames
German-language surnames